Russell William Turner (born 12 May 1941), an Australian politician, is a councillor of the City of Orange Council, since 2012. Turner was previously a Member of the New South Wales Legislative Assembly representing Orange between 1996 and 2011 for the Nationals.

Career
Turner was born in Sydney and educated at Manly Boys High School.  He is married with two sons and one daughter.

The seat of Orange is a safe National Party seat and has been so for many decades.  Turner was only the third person to hold the position since 1947.  In the 2007 state election, he successfully defended his seat and increased his majority when challenged by independent candidate, John Davis, the then mayor of Orange. In 2010 Turner announced his decision to not contest the 2011 state election. The National Party endorsed Andrew Gee, a local lawyer and barrister, who successfully contested the seat.

In 2012 Turner was elected to Orange City Council, receiving 7.51% of the first preference formal votes, and was the first candidate to achieve the quota required to be elected to the Council. Despite speculation that he would seek election as mayor, Turner did not seek election.

References

 

Members of the New South Wales Legislative Assembly
National Party of Australia members of the Parliament of New South Wales
Living people
1941 births
21st-century Australian politicians